Mukhtar Abraruly Kul-Mukhammed (Mūhtar Abrarūly Qūl-Mūhammed, ; born 12 December 1960) is a Kazakh politician who serving as a member of the Kazakh Senate since 1 February 2018. Prior to that, he was the First Deputy Chairman of Nur Otan from 2016 to 2018, advisor to the President of Kazakhstan from 2015 to 2016, 2014 to 2015, and 2003 to 2014, Minister of Culture and Information from 2013 to 2014, State Secretary of Kazakhstan from 2012 to 2013, Minister of Culture from 2008 to 2012, akim of Kyzylorda Region from 2007 to 2008, Akorda Press Secretary from 2004 to 2007, and the Minister of Culture, Information and Public Accord from 2001 to 2004.

Biography

Early life and career 
Kul-Mukhammed was born to a Kazakh Muslim family in Chuguchak, China. In 1961, He along with his family returned to their historic homeland of Kazakhstan and settled in the village of Makanchi in the district of East Kazakhstan Region. In 1982, he graduated from the Al-Farabi Kazakh National University with a degree in journalism. 
From 1983 to 1992, Kul-Mukhammed had been holding positions such as a Scientific Editor, a Senior Scientific Editor, head of Editorial Office of Philosophy, Law and Sociology, an executive secretary and deputy editor of the main edition of the Kazakh Soviet Encyclopedia. 

From 1992 to 1999, he was the director of Atamura enterprise, the chairman of JSC Atamura, and the president of Atamura corporation. From 1994 to 1999, Kul-Mukhammed worked at the Al-Farabi Kazakh National University as a senior lecturer, an associate professor, and as an acting professor.

In 1995, he defended his candidate thesis in the field of history named "Problems of social and political history of Kazakhstan in XVIII century and the beginning of XIX century". In 1999, Kul-Mukhammed earned a PhD from his thesis in the field of jurisprudence on the topic: "Zhakyp Akpaev and the evolution of political and legal views of Alash figures (the end of the XIX-and the beginning of the XX century)."

Political career 
From 30 November 1999, he was a member of the Senate of Kazakhstan, where he served as a Secretary of the Senate Committee on Legislation and Judicial-Legal Reform, and the chairman of the Senate Committee on Socio-Cultural Development.
In 2001, by the decision of the Presidium of the Higher Attestation Commission of the Republic of Kazakhstan dated 31 May 2001, he was awarded an academic title of Professor in Law.

On 4 May 2001, Kul-Mukhammed was appointed as the Minister of Culture, Information and Public Accord of Kazakhstan until his dismissal on 13 September 2003. From 31 April 2004 to 10 January 2007, he served as the Akorda Press Secretary. While occupying the post, Kul-Mukhammed was the deputy head of the Presidential Administration from 2006. On 11 January 2007, he was appointed the akim of Kyzylorda Region. While serving as the akim, Kul-Mukhammed became the Special Representative of the President of the Republic of Kazakhstan on Baikonur complex on 21 March 2008.

On 12 May 2008, Kul-Mukhammed became the Minister of Culture until 23 January 2012, when he was appointed as the State Secretary of Kazakhstan. From 16 January 2013 to 11 March 2014, Kul-Mukhammed served as the Minister of Culture and Information. From 2014 to 2016, he periodically held posts as the advisor to the President of Kazakhstan. In 2015, he led public campaign in the support of the candidacy of Nursultan Nazarbayev in the 2015 Kazakh presidential election. On 6 May 2016, Kul-Mukhammed was appointed as the First Deputy Chairman of Nur Otan. He held that position until he was dismissed on 1 February 2018, after becoming a member of the Senate of Kazakhstan.
On January 23, 2023, the President of the Republic of Kazakhstan, Tokayev, signed a decree on the termination of the powers of the deputy of the Senate, Kul-Mukhammed Mukhtar. 

Since 28 March 2019, he's been the head of the Senate Committee on International Relations, Defense and Security.

Awards
The Order of Parasat (2010) 
The Order of Kurmet (2004)
Medal for "10 years of Astana" (2008)
Laureate of the State Prize of the Republic of Kazakhstan (1996)
Honorary citizen of Astana city
Honorary citizen of Abai district
Honorary citizen of Ayagoz district

References 
Қазақстан Тәуелсіздік күніне арналған марапаттары

1960 births
Living people
People from Tacheng
Government ministers of Kazakhstan
Culture ministers
Recipients of the Order of Kurmet

Nur Otan politicians